Aleš Čerin (born 18 July 1949) is a Slovenian businessman and a politician. In 1973, he graduated from law at the University of Ljubljana. He was the Secretary-General of the Government of the Republic of Slovenia since 1986 till 1992, during the Slovenian proclamation of independence in 1991. Since 1992, he worked in the retail company Mercator, and was since 1997 till 2005 member of its executive board. He was elected to the city council of the City Municipality of Ljubljana in October 2006 as a member of the Zoran Janković List and was named by Janković a deputy mayor of the municipality.

On 22 December midnight, he replaced Zoran Janković as the leader of the municipality, as Janković was elected to the National Assembly and retained his mayoral post only till 21 December 2011, midnight. The replacement was made according to the law, but Čerin's leading position was only compatible with the statute of the municipality until the beginning of January 2012, when a tender for the by-election was opened. The election was held on 25 March 2012.

Čerin is also a keen bicycler and was the president of the Cycling Federation of Slovenia from 1997 till 2005.

References

1949 births
Living people
University of Ljubljana alumni
Businesspeople from Ljubljana
Secretary-Generals of the Government of Slovenia
Slovenian sports executives and administrators
People from the City Municipality of Ljubljana
Secretaries-general